is a manga series written and illustrated by Minoru Tachikawa. The series was adapted into a two-episode OVA series by Daia in 1996. It was licensed by ADV Films.

Characters
 /

Eroge
A eroge and sequel to the anime titled Kotetsu no Daibouken was released on April 19, 1996 for the PC-9800 by T2 Co., Ltd, a former subsidiary of KSS.

References

External links
 

1992 manga
1996 anime OVAs
1997 anime OVAs
ADV Films
Manga series
Samurai in anime and manga
Wanimagazine manga
OVAs based on manga
Seinen manga